K. G. Shankar (26 August 1950 – 17 January 2021) was an Indian politician and member of the Bharatiya Janata Party. Shankar was a member of the Puducherry Legislative Assembly from 3 June 2017 till his death on 17 January 2021 as he was nominated by the Central Government of India. He was a nominated MLA, named by the Government of India. He was Treasurer of the BJP's Puducherry unit.

References 

1950 births
2021 deaths
21st-century Indian politicians
People from Puducherry
Bharatiya Janata Party politicians from Puducherry
Puducherry MLAs 2016–2021
Puducherry politicians
Nominated members of the Puducherry Legislative Assembly